Tepepan is a town in the  México City city borough of Xochimilco. In Nahuatl means " on the hill "; This name must locals built a queue at its top More adoratorio one Tonanzin UN, the mother goddess of the Aztecs. The location of this altar, and now its colonial church is unique, because at the solstice both in the ortho As in the twilight of European standardization bodies diastolic Sun Above the emblematic volcano Teuhtli appears and hides behind " Pico del Aguila " the Ajusco . Tepepan has a sedimentation of volcanic rock, which Privilege became a people Whose fences and streets have been constructed predominantly in stone, which gives the UN Distinctiveness. http://luisguerreromartinez.com/Tepepan/mexico-cult%20(1).htm

References

Neighborhoods in Mexico City